Albury was launched in 1804 at Newcastle upon Tyne. She traded primarily with the Baltic, but elsewhere as well. In 1820 she carried settlers to South Africa. She was wrecked in October 1837 at Riga, Russia.

Career
Albury first appeared in Lloyd's Register in 1805 with T.Boyle as master and owner, and trade London–Riga.

In 1820 Albury carried 167 settlers from England to South Africa under the auspices of the Government Settler Scheme. Captain Cunningham left Liverpool on 13 February 1820. Albury reached Simon's Bay on 1 May and arrived at Algoa Bay, Port Elizabeth, on 15 May.

Fate
Albury was driven ashore and wrecked on 21 October at the mouth of the Daugava while she was on a voyage from Riga to London. Her crew were rescued.

Notes, citations, and references
Notes

Citations

References

1804 ships
Ships built on the River Tyne
Age of Sail merchant ships of England
Ships of the 1820 settlers
Maritime incidents in October 1837